Schuler AG is a German company headquartered in Göppingen, Baden-Württemberg which operates in the field of forming technology and is the world's largest manufacturer of presses. The presses are used to create car body sheets and other car parts as well as items such as beverage and aerosol cans, coins, sinks, large pipes, and parts for electric motors.

The company has production sites in Germany, Switzerland, Brazil, USA and China and in addition to the automotive industry and its suppliers, it also supplies the household appliances and electrical industry, the forging, energy, aerospace and railway industries as well as mints.
In total, the company has a presence in 40 countries with its own sites and representatives.

As of December 31, 2016, the company employed 6,617 people and in the 2016 fiscal year, it achieved a turnover of €1.2 billion. Earnings before interest and taxes (EBIT) grew in 2015 to €95.4 million, the Group result was €77.4 million.

Schuler AG's shares were listed on the regulated market on the Frankfurt and Stuttgart stock exchanges. When the public float portion fell below 10% in 2012, Schuler fell off the SDAX share index. In 2014 the shares were delisted from the regulated stock exchange; today, the shares are only listed on the open market on the Munich stock exchange.

History 
The company was founded by Louis Schuler in 1839 and produced the first sheet metal forming machines in 1852. In 1895, the first minting presses were exported to China. Schuler presented the world's first transfer press at the Exposition Universelle fair in Paris in 1900. In 1924, the first body panel press for mass production was delivered. Internationalization began in 1961. In 1999, Schuler went public and entered the field of laser technology with the acquisition of Held Lasertechnik in Dietzenbach, Germany. In 2007, Schuler acquired Müller Weingarten AG, which also included the company Umformtechnik Erfurt, along with others. This acquisition created a global leading provider of forming technology for metal processing with a market share of around 35 percent. 

In the same year, Schuler launched its ServoDirect Technology for presses, which has now become the industry standard. It was followed by the TwinServo Technology in 2014.

A double-lever deep-drawing press manufactured by Schuler dating from 1928 was retained at the Automobilwerk Eisenach , and is exhibited outside the Automobile Welt museum in Eisenach as a technical monument, after having been in operation there until 1998.

When the public float portion fell below 10% in 2012, Schuler fell off the SDAX share index.

In May 2012, Austrian company Andritz AG acquired 38.5% of the shares in Schuler AG from the Schuler-Voith family, and made the shareholders an offer of €20 per share. As of February 15, 2013, Andritz reported a stake of 93.57 percent, after the competition authorities had given their approval for the acquisition. 

In spring 2014, the Schuler AG Executive Board decided to apply for the Schuler AG shares to be delisted.

In 2017, the Schuler Innovation Tower at the Göppingen headquarters was officially opened.

As part of the sponsoring activities, Schuler supports projects in the field of science, research, education, social affairs and good citizenship at the various locations. The Louis Schuler Fund for Education and Science, for instance, is assigned the task of providing support for trainees and educational institutions in the field of technology.

References

External links 

 Official website
 

Companies based in Baden-Württemberg
Industrial machine manufacturers
Manufacturing companies established in 1839
German brands
German companies established in 1839